Abraxas: Book of Angels Volume 19 is the debut album led by Shanir Ezra Blumenkranz performing compositions from John Zorn's second Masada book, "The Book of Angels".

Reception

Paul Acquaro stated "Shanir Ezra Blumenkranz's interpretations of John Zorn's second Masada book is a raucous one that is full of energy and urgency... There is a certain consistency to the music, there is a certain amount of cohesion that connects this book of songs, and there is a wonderful contrast between the delicately melodic and thrillingly thrashing".

Griffin Vacheron called the album "the most high-powered, vivacious, and at times frighteningly dynamic entry in the series" stating "Blumenkranz and Co. really manage to bring their own unique fire to the table while still preserving the overall Masada vibe, and for that they should be commended".

Track listing 
All compositions by John Zorn
 "Domos" - 3:59   
 "Tse'an" - 4:09   
 "Nachmiel" - 3:35   
 "Yaasriel" - 5:21   
 "Muriel" - 3:26   
 "Maspiel" - 5:50   
 "Aupiel" - 3:43   
 "Nahuriel" - 4:57   
 "Biztha" - 3:37   
 "Zaphiel" - 5:21

Personnel 
Shanir Ezra Blumenkranz - gimbri
Aram Bajakian, Eyal Maoz - guitar 
Kenny Grohowski - drums

References 

2012 albums
Albums produced by John Zorn
Tzadik Records albums
Book of Angels albums